Gordon James McNeill (August 17, 1922 to July 14, 1999) was a Member of the Legislative Assembly from 1975 until 1978, representing the constituency of Meadow Lake for the New Democratic Party.

Biography 
McNeill was born in Bateman and was raised in Shamrock and later married Henrietta Elizabeth (Nickie) Smith. He died in 1999.

References 

1922 births
1999 deaths
Saskatchewan New Democratic Party MLAs
Gravelbourg No. 104, Saskatchewan